= Ahmed Harfoush =

Ahmed Harfoush أحمد حَرفوش
- Born: Cairo, Egypt
- Genre: Jazz
- Occupations: Singer, performer, music educator
- Years active: 1990s–present

Ahmed Harfoush (Arabic: أحمد حَرفوش) is an Egyptian jazz singer, performer, and music educator. He is best known as the founder and frontman of The Riff Band, one of Egypt’s leading jazz ensembles, and as chairman of the Jazz Society of Egypt. Active since the early 1990s, Harfoush has performed internationally and played a key role in developing Egypt’s contemporary jazz scene.

== Early life and education ==
Ahmed Harfoush began singing at the age of seventeen while on a family holiday in Luxor, Egypt. Encouraged by his father, he joined a choir in Cairo under choirmaster Grieg Martin, director of the Cairo Singers, which rehearsed at the Italian Cultural Center.

In the early 1990s, Harfoush founded the rock ’n’ roll band Twelve Strings, performing at the American University in Cairo’s (AUC) Ewart Hall. He later joined AUC’s Osiris Singers under the direction of Professor Larry Catlin, performing Broadway excerpts, classical works, renaissance pieces, and jazz standards—an experience that sparked his lasting interest in jazz. After Catlin’s death, Harfoush became the director of the Osiris Singers, continuing the ensemble’s legacy.

From 1995 to 2000, Harfoush sang as tenor soloist with the AUC Cairo Choral Society, performing in major choral works such as Handel’s Messiah, Schubert’s Stabat Mater, Dvořák’s Mass in D, and Mozart’s Solemn Vespers.

He studied vocal technique and breathing methods with Dr. Raouf Zeidan, Dr. Larry Catlin, David Hales, and Carol-Ann Clouston in Cairo. Later, he trained in musical theatre at London’s Mountview Academy for Theatre Arts, where he studied acting, dance, and singing with West End theatre tutors.

== Career ==
Harfoush’s professional career developed within Cairo’s live music scene. After early performances at Cairo Jazz Club, he joined the group Riff, which he later developed into The Riff Band. The ensemble became one of Egypt’s most prominent jazz groups, performing at major venues, corporate events, and embassy functions.

He has performed across Europe and the Middle East, including in Paris, London, Budapest, Prague, Damascus, Slovenia, Dubai, and various cities in the United Kingdom such as Bath, York, and Edinburgh. In 2009, Harfoush performed with the Chris Byars Jazz Quartet from New York City at Marmar Café in Damascus and aboard Prague’s Jazz Boat on the Vltava River.

At the Edinburgh Fringe Festival in 2011, he presented The Cole Porter Songbook with pianist David Patrick and bassist Ed Kelly at Edinburgh’s Jazz Bar. He also performed with the South London Jazz Orchestra in 2012, singing pieces from the Great American Songbook.

Harfoush has produced and headlined several jazz productions in Cairo, including Sing Sing Sing (2009), a 1940s jazz revue at a downtown theatre in collaboration with Spanish cabaret act The Divinas and the Spanish Embassy; The Rat Pack Show (2010) at El Sawy Culture Wheel, a tribute to Frank Sinatra, Dean Martin, and Sammy Davis Jr.; and Frank ’n’ Ella (2012), also at El Sawy Culture Wheel.

In late 2012, he launched Ahmed Harfoush & The Jazz Project, a Cairo-based ensemble focusing on modern interpretations of jazz standards.

In 2020, Harfoush celebrated a decade of performances under his Egyptian Jazz Projekt with a series of concerts highlighting the development of local jazz culture.

== Teaching and advocacy ==
Alongside performing, Harfoush teaches voice privately and at international schools, music studios, and community centres in Cairo.

He co-founded the Cairo Jazz Festival in 2009 with pianist and composer Amr Salah, an event that brought together international jazz bands, workshops, and lectures. The festival later inspired the creation of the Jazz Society of Egypt, an organisation offering jazz-related education, film screenings, and public programs. Harfoush currently serves as its chairman.

== See also ==
- The Riff Band
- Cairo Jazz Festival
- Jazz Society of Egypt
